Eli Goldschmidt (born 17 October 1953) is a former Israeli politician who served as a member of the Knesset for One Israel and the Labor Party between 1992 and 2001.

Biography
Born in Tel Aviv, Goldschmidt studied law at Tel Aviv University, where he gained an MA before working as a lawyer.

He was first elected to the Knesset on the Labor Party list in 1992 and chaired the House Committee and the Joint Committee for the Knesset Budget during his first term. After being re-elected in 1996 he chaired the Economic Affairs Committee. For the 1999 elections he was placed 13th on the One Israel list (an alliance of Labor, Meimad and Gesher), and retained his seat as the alliance won 26 mandates. He was appointed chairman of the Finance Committee, but resigned his seat on 15 February 2001 and was replaced by Mordechai Mishani.

References

External links
 

1953 births
People from Tel Aviv
Tel Aviv University alumni
Israeli lawyers
Living people
One Israel politicians
Israeli Labor Party politicians
Members of the 13th Knesset (1992–1996)
Members of the 14th Knesset (1996–1999)
Members of the 15th Knesset (1999–2003)